Punjab Institute of Cardiology (PIC), located in Lahore, Pakistan, is a 347-bed tertiary care hospital providing nationwide comprehensive cardiac care services.

Services provided
This hospital services include cardiac emergency, OPD, diagnostics, interventional and invasive cardiology and cardiac surgery. Fully equipped cardiac ambulatory services are also available round the clock. More than 160,000 patients are examined annually at OPD. More than 17,000 are admitted. PIC is the second largest cardiac center in Pakistan after NICVD karachi, with 31,000 echocardiographs, 4000 nuclear medicine procedures, 16,000 angiograms, 3500 angioplasties including 5000 stents and 2500 cardiac surgeries a year.

Research and training
Punjab Institute of Cardiology is also actively involved in research and postgraduate training in cardiology, cardiac surgery and anesthesia. It is the first ISO certified hospital in the government sector.

In 2015, the College of Physicians and Surgeons Pakistan selected the Punjab Institute of Cardiology for training in Electrophysiology and Interventional Cardiology.

90% of patients at the Punjab Institute of Cardiology (PIC) receive free treatment; it is a government-funded hospital.

A problem that occurred in January 2012 at this institution showed a problem with drug packaging. That month more than 100 heart patients died of overdoses from a particular drug that had inadequate labeling. Hundreds more patients suffered nonfatal adverse reactions from this drug. This problem, while bringing unwanted attention to the Punjab Institute of Cardiology, was not unique to that hospital system.

Emergency department expansion
An expanded emergency department is to open in March 2016 and was near completion in January 2016. This will help the hospital handle heavy workload better at the emergency department.

Attack at hospital
On 11 December 2019, in an unprecedented assault on a hospital led to death of 3 patients and injuries to several others.  However, the Young Doctors Association (YDA) of Pakistan reports for death of 12 patients during the attack at hospital. Reportedly a large number of lawyers started marching from Mall Road Lahore and gathered outside the Punjab Institute of Cardiology to protest against a mocking viral video. They closed the hospital's entrance and exit points, within no time their protest turned violent and remained catastrophic for hours

References

External links
 

Hospital buildings completed in 1989
Hospitals in Lahore
Teaching hospitals in Pakistan
Heart disease organizations